Gabriel Banal (born September 9, 1990) is a Filipino professional basketball player for the Blackwater Bossing of the Philippine Basketball Association (PBA). He was drafted 22nd overall pick in the 2nd round of the 2014 PBA Draft. He is the son of former basketball player and coach Joel Banal.

Amateur career
He went on to play for the Go For Gold Scratchers of the PBA D-League. After winning the finals in the 2018 PBA D-League Foundation Cup Finals, he was given the Finals MVP Award.

Professional career

San Miguel to Barako Bull
Shortly after he got drafted by the San Miguel Beermen, he was traded to the Barako Bull Energy along with Jojo Duncil, Chico Lañete and a 2016 first round pick (Jeoffrey Javillonar was later selected), for the draft rights of third pick Ronald Pascual.

GlobalPort Batang Pier
He then played for GlobalPort Batang Pier, averaging limited minutes.

Bacoor City Strikers
He also played for the Bacoor City Strikers of the Maharlika Pilipinas Basketball League. After the 2018–19 MPBL Datu Cup, he received the honors of being the MVP of the 2018–19 MPBL Datu Cup.

Alaska Aces
He then returned to the Philippine Basketball Association, signing a one conference deal with the Alaska Aces.

TNT Tropang Giga
After securing his release from the Aces, Banal signed a two-year deal with the TNT Tropang Giga.

Blackwater Bossing
On September 19, 2022, Banal was traded to the Blackwater Bossing in a three-team trade involving Blackwater, TNT, and NLEX Road Warriors.

PBA career statistics

As of the end of 2022–23 season

Season-by-season averages

|-
| align=left | 
| align=left | GlobalPort
| 2 || 14.0 || .333 || .500 || — || 1.0 || .0 || .0 || .0 || 3.0
|-
| align=left | 
| align=left | GlobalPort
| 2 || 5.6 || .333 || .000 || .000 || .5 || .0 || .5 || .0 || 1.0
|-
| align=left rowspan=2| 
| align=left | Alaska
| rowspan=2|21 || rowspan=2|18.5 || rowspan=2|.451 || rowspan=2|.466 || rowspan=2|.615 || rowspan=2|2.6 || rowspan=2|1.4 || rowspan=2|.8 || rowspan=2|.1 || rowspan=2|7.6
|- 
| align=left | TNT
|-
| align=left rowspan=2| 
| align=left | TNT
| rowspan=2|33 || rowspan=2|17.5 || rowspan=2|.350 || rowspan=2|.306 || rowspan=2|.810 || rowspan=2|2.1 || rowspan=2|1.6 || rowspan=2|.5 || rowspan=2|.2 || rowspan=2|4.2
|- 
| align=left | Blackwater
|-class=sortbottom
| align="center" colspan=2 | Career
| 58 || 17.3 || .395 || .387 || .688 || 2.2 || 1.4 || .6 || .1 || 5.3

References

1990 births
Living people
Alaska Aces (PBA) players
Basketball players from Metro Manila
Blackwater Bossing players
De La Salle Green Archers basketball players
Filipino men's basketball players
Maharlika Pilipinas Basketball League players
Mapúa Cardinals basketball players
NorthPort Batang Pier players
Power forwards (basketball)
San Miguel Beermen draft picks
Small forwards
TNT Tropang Giga players
Place of birth missing (living people)